The  (or simply ) was a hereditary name borne by the peoples of Roman Italy and later by the citizens of the Roman Republic and the Roman Empire. It was originally the name of one's  (family or clan) by patrilineal descent. However, as Rome expanded its frontiers and non-Roman peoples were progressively granted citizenship and concomitant , the latter lost its value in indicating patrilineal ancestry. 

For example, three members of gens Julia were Gaius Julius Caesar and his sisters Julia Major and Julia Minor ("Julia the elder" and "Julia the younger").

History
The nomen gentilicium, or "gentile name" designated a Roman citizen as a member of a gens.  A gens, which may be translated as "race", "family", or "clan", constituted an extended Roman family, all of whom shared the same nomen, and claimed descent from a common ancestor.  Particularly in the early Republic, the gens functioned as a state within the state, observing its own sacred rites, and establishing private laws, which were binding on its members, although not on the community as a whole.

Although the other peoples of Italy also possessed nomina (plural of nomen), the distinction between Romans and the non-Roman peoples of Italy disappeared as various communities were granted the Roman franchise, and following the Social War (91–87 BC), when this was extended to most of Italy.  Once this occurred, possession of the nomen gentilicium identified a man as a Roman citizen.

The nomen was an essential element of Roman nomenclature throughout Roman history, although its usefulness as a distinguishing element declined precipitously following the Constitutio Antoniniana, which effectively granted the nomen "Aurelius" to vast numbers of newly enfranchised citizens.  Countless other "new Romans" acquired the nomina of important families in this manner during imperial times; in the fourth century Aurelius was surpassed in number by Flavius, and other names became quite common, including Valerius, Claudius, Fabius, Julius, and Junius.  These names no longer had any utility in indicating one's patrilineal ancestry, and became largely perfunctory.  They could be changed to indicate rank or status, and even abbreviated, much as praenomina had been.

Both in its original form, identifying an individual as a member of a Roman gens, and in its later form, as an indicator of status, the nomen continued to be used for several decades after the collapse of Imperial authority in the west.  The last datable example of a nomen gentilicium belongs to a Julia Rogatiana, who died at Volubilis in AD 655; in the east nomina such as Flavius continued until the beginning of the eighth century; Flavius Basilius was Pagarch of Aphrodito in Egypt in 710.

See also
 Roman naming conventions
 Agnomen
 List of Roman nomina

Notes

References

 
Roman naming conventions